(born 20 October 1930) is a retired Japanese historian of China and professor emeritus of Osaka University, who specializes in Song dynasty history. A member of the Japan Academy, he has received the Order of Culture, Order of the Sacred Treasure, and Person of Cultural Merit in Japan. In 2018, he jointly received the Tang Prize in Sinology with Stephen Owen. Several of his specialist works have been translated into English, including the landmark study Commerce and Society in Sung China (1968, abridged English translation published in 2 volumes in 1970), which remains one of the most respected works on Chinese economic history.

Works
 Commerce and Society in Sung China (translation)

References

1930 births
Living people
Historians of China
Japanese sinologists
Writers from Tokyo
University of Tokyo alumni
Academic staff of Osaka University
Members of the Japan Academy